Eleazar Davidman (also Elazar Davidman, ; 9 December 1936 – October 2007) was a Jewish Israeli tennis player.

Tennis career
Davidman competed in men's singles and men's doubles in tennis for Israel at the 1953 Maccabiah Games. He competed for Israel in men's singles at the 1961 Maccabiah Games, defeating American Sidney Schwartz in the third round.

Starting in 1956 Davidman played 39 matches for the Israel Davis Cup team in Davis Cup competition, going 12–20 in singles and 5–12 in doubles, over the course of 17 ties. He was Israel's top tennis player beginning in that year, and their first international-level player.

In 1964 he competed in the Australian Open, making it to the second round in both singles and in doubles, with Lưu Hoàng Đức of South Vietnam.

See also
 Sports in Israel

References

External links
 
 
 
 Obituary in Hebrew
 Memorial website (Hebrew)

Israeli male tennis players
Jewish tennis players
1936 births
2007 deaths
Date of death missing
Maccabiah Games tennis players
Competitors at the 1953 Maccabiah Games
Competitors at the 1961 Maccabiah Games
Maccabiah Games competitors for Israel